George Washington Smith (1820s–October 24, 1873) was a justice of the Supreme Court of Texas from August 1866 to September 1867.

He died of yellow fever at his home in Colorado County, Texas.

References

Justices of the Texas Supreme Court
1820s births
1873 deaths
19th-century American judges